Adrián Barbón Rodríguez (born 4 January 1979 in Laviana, Asturias) is a Spanish politician. He is the secretary general of the Asturian Socialist Federation, the regional socialist party affiliated with the national Spanish Socialist Workers' Party (PSOE) and the current President of the Principality of Asturias.

Personal life
Adrián Barbón was born 4 January 1979, in the municipality of Laviana, in the heart of mining region of Asturias. He received his primary education in San José School, located in the neighbouring town of Sotrondio, that closed in 2019 as a consequence of the decline in population in the region. He finished secondary education in IES David Vázquez Martínez, in his hometown of Pola de Laviana. Adrián Barbón graduated in law from the University of Oviedo.

Political career
After serving as mayor of Laviana since 2008 to 2017, Barbón assumed the general secretariat of the Asturian Socialist Federation on 17 September 2017. Two years later, after winning the 2019 Asturian regional election, he was named President of the Principality of Asturias.

On 17 December 2021, he was diagnosed with COVID-19, being hospitalized and with his vice-president Juan Cofiño replacing him as interim President.

References

1979 births
Living people
Presidents of the Principality of Asturias
People from Laviana
Politicians from Asturias